Sand to Snow National Monument is a U.S. National Monument located in San Bernardino County and northern Riverside County, Southern California.

It protects diverse montane and desert habitats of the San Bernardino Mountains, southern Mojave Desert, and northwestern Colorado Desert.

Geography

Over  of the national monument are within the San Gorgonio Wilderness area, which was designated by Congress in 1964. An eastern border in the Little San Bernardino Mountains abuts Joshua Tree National Park. A separate section expands the Bighorn Mountain Wilderness area to the northeast.

 of the Pacific Crest National Scenic Trail pass through the monument. The headwaters of the Santa Ana River, Whitewater River, Morongo Creek, and San Gorgonio River are within it.  The park protects a significant wildlife corridor and landscape linkage between the San Bernardino National Forest/San Gorgonio Wilderness area, Joshua Tree National Park, and Bighorn Mountain Wilderness area.

Ecology
Diverse plant communities in the park support flora of the higher Mojave and lower Sonoran Colorado Deserts, chaparral, California oak woodland, coniferous forest, and alpine ecosystems, making it the most botanically rich national monument in the United States.

Plant life native to the San Bernardino Mountains is influenced by their location at the convergence of three distinct ecosystems: California chaparral and woodlands to the west, Mojave Desert to the east, and Sonoran Desert to the south.  There are over 1,600 different plant species native to the range.

Sand dunes are home to the endangered fringe-toed lizard at the lower elevation confluence of the Whitewater and San Gorgonio Rivers, while Desert bighorn sheep are found at higher elevations.

Designation
Sand to Snow National Monument was designated by President Obama on February 12, 2016 along with Castle Mountains National Monument and Mojave Trails National Monument. It is governed by the United States Forest Service and the Bureau of Land Management.

The Conservancy established Whitewater Preserve,  Mission Creek Preserve,  and Pioneertown Mountains Preserve. The Big Morongo Canyon Preserve was protected as a wildlife reserve in 1982, and later included in the monument, forming thus its most developed area. The aggregate set of preserved lands extends recreational opportunities in the Coachella Valley region.

See also
List of national monuments of the United States

Big Morongo Canyon Preserve

References

External links

USFS: Sand to Snow National Monument website
BLM California: Sand to Snow National Monument website
Sand to Snow National Monument Map
Sand to Snow National Monument Q&As
Presidential Proclamation – Establishment of the Sand to Snow National Monument
BLM California: Flickr photo gallery of Sand to Snow National Monument

 
National Monuments in California
Parks in Riverside County, California
Parks in San Bernardino County, California
Bureau of Land Management National Monuments
United States Forest Service National Monuments
Protected areas of the Colorado Desert
Protected areas of the Mojave Desert
Coachella Valley
San Bernardino Mountains
San Bernardino National Forest
Bureau of Land Management areas in California
Protected areas established in 2016
2016 establishments in California
Units of the National Landscape Conservation System
National Monuments designated by Barack Obama